Anthony Joseph Patrick Ward (born 8 October 1954, Dublin, Ireland), commonly referred to as Tony Ward, is an Irish former rugby union and football player during the 1970s and 1980s. He played rugby as a fly-half for, among others, Munster, Leinster, the British and Irish Lions and the Barbarians. Ward was selected 1979 European rugby player of the year.

Playing career

Ireland
Ward won 19 caps for Ireland between 1978 and 1987. He made his international debut against Scotland at Lansdowne Road on 21 January 1978 at the age of 23. He helped Ireland win 12–9 and during the 1978 Five Nations Championship he scored 38 points, a record for a debutant. He made one major tour with Ireland, to Australia in 1979. During his career as an Ireland international he scored 113 points, including 29 penalties, 7 conversions and 4 drop goals. He played his last game for Ireland on 3 June 1987 in a 32–9 win over Tonga during the 1987 Rugby World Cup.

Munster
Ward also inspired Munster to a legendary win over New Zealand, scoring two drop goals and a conversion in a 12–0 victory at Thomond Park on 31 October 1978. To date Munster are the only Irish provincial men's team ever to beat the All-Blacks.

British and Irish Lions
Ward also played one Test game for the British and Irish Lions during the 1980 South Africa tour. He set a Lions Test record by scoring 18 points, including 5 penalties and a drop goal. It was also a record for any player against South Africa.

Awards
Ward was the first ever recipient of a European Rugby Player of the Year award for his performances in the 1979 Five Nations Championship.

Association football

Ward also played association football for both Shamrock Rovers and Limerick United. In his last season with Rovers, 1974–75 he scored 6 league goals. He played for Limerick United in the 1981–82 UEFA Cup and in 1982 he helped them win the FAI Cup.

Later years

Journalism
Since retiring as a sportsman, Ward has worked as a sports journalist, most notably with the Irish Independent, and as a rugby commentator for Raidió Teilifís Éireann (RTÉ).

Ward started as a co-commentator for the 1988 Five Nations Championship, and remained in that role for many years.
 
While playing rugby he had been a geography and PE teacher in St Andrews secondary school.

Coach
Ward is currently involved in St. Gerards School in Bray, where he is coaching the Senior Rugby team and has been doing so for a number of years now.

Tony was, during the '90's, a highly valued and well respected coach for St Andrews School in Booterstown, Ireland.
He constantly downplayed his fame and success and wouldn't even be in the room if another coach played video footage of his legendary tries.

Honours
Association football
 FAI Cup
 Limerick 1982

See also
List of players who have converted from one football code to another

References

Sources
 The Hoops by Paul Doolan and Robert Goggins
 ''The Good, the Bad and the Rugby - The Biography of Tony Ward - 
by John Scally, Blackwater Press, 1993

External links
  Bio at www.sporting-heroes.net

1954 births
Living people
Irish Independent people
Irish rugby union players
Ireland international rugby union players
Association footballers from Dublin (city)
Rugby union players from Dublin (city)
Irish rugby union commentators
Rugby union fly-halves
British & Irish Lions rugby union players from Ireland
St Mary's College RFC players
Barbarian F.C. players
Greystones RFC players
Garryowen Football Club players
Leinster Rugby players
Munster Rugby players
League of Ireland players
Republic of Ireland association footballers
Shamrock Rovers F.C. players
Limerick F.C. players
Association footballers not categorized by position
People educated at St Mary's College, Dublin